Jonas Patrik Ljungström (12 March 1827 – 22 October 1898) was a Swedish cartographer, geodesist, and teacher at the Royal Institute of Technology.

Biography

Jonas Patrik Ljungström was born 12 March 1827 in Uddevalla as the son of jeweler Johan Patrik Ljungström, and Maria Christina (née Spaak). His great grandfather was the Protestant reformer Peter Spaak, and his 3rd great grandfather early industrialist Abraham Hülphers the Older. He married Amalia (née Falck), and their issue included Georg Ljungström, Oscar Ljungström, Birger Ljungström, and Fredrik Ljungström.

After examination in Stockholm in 1849, Jonas Patrik Ljungström served as land surveyor for the Gothenburg and Bohus County from 1864, and as cartographer at the governmental agency for cartography in Stockholm 1873-1888. Parallel to this, he developed land survey and precision instruments in own manufactory that cooperated among others with the early manufactory of L. M. Ericsson. Furthermore, he taught at the Royal Institute of Technology in Stockholm.

Jonas Patrik Ljungström's multiple technical innovations contributed and earned rewards among others at the General Industrial Exposition of Stockholm (1866), the General Art and Industrial Exposition of Stockholm (1897), Exposition Universelle (1878), Exposition Universelle (1900), the Brussels Geographic Conference (1876), the Centennial Exposition in Philadelphia (1876), and the World's Columbian Exposition in Chicago (1893). While in Philadelphia 1876 he met the Swedish physicist Salomon August Andrée who remained a friend of the family until his death, teaching Ljungström's sons Birger and Fredrik in physics.

The most successful of his inventions, the distance tube land surveying precision instrument, endured in professional use until the 1950s. Noted by John Ericsson (1803-1889) as "an innovative mind of extraordinary capability and extensive mechanical wit", Jonas Patrik Ljungström's works are represented by the Swedish National Museum of Science and Technology, as well as by regional cultural heritage museums.

Works
 Beskrifning öfver distanstub med sjelfreglerande skala jemte sättet för instrumentets justering och användande (1877)

Distinctions
  Silver medal at the Exposition Universelle (1878)
  Member of Academie Agricole Manufacturière et Commerciale (1878)
  Gold medal of the Royal Swedish Academy of Sciences (1877)
  Wallmark Prize of Royal Swedish Academy of Sciences (1877)
  Gold medal at the Centennial Exposition in Philadelphia (1876)

Further reading
 Geodetisk mätningskunskap (Albert Bonniers förlag, 1876) by Johan Oskar Andersson (http://runeberg.org/geodet/0253.html)
 Fredrik Ljungström 1875-1964 - Uppfinnare och inspiratör (1999), Olof Ljungström

References

External links
 http://runeberg.org/tektid/1928b/0043.html
 http://www.lantm.lth.se/fileadmin/fastighetsvetenskap/utbildning/Examensarbete/07_5154_Crolina_Gustafsson_pdf.pdf
 https://www.europeana.eu/portal/sv/record/916105/bhm_photo_UMFA53226_1006.html
 https://digitaltmuseum.se/011014306770/lantmatare-jonas-patrik-ljungstrom-1827-1898

1827 births
1898 deaths
Jonas Patrik
Swedish geodesists
Academic staff of the KTH Royal Institute of Technology
Swedish cartographers
Swedish surveyors
19th-century cartographers